Slok Air International (Gambia) Ltd was a scheduled passenger airline registered in Gambia. Its main base was at Banjul International Airport in Banjul, the Gambia.

History

Slok Air and Slok Air Gambia
Slok Air International was founded in Nigeria by the Slok Group.

Service was halted in the end of December 2007 due to maintenance and was resumed mid-February 2008, but by July published reports described financial difficulties with the airline, which continued into the autumn of 2008 with creditors filling lawsuits against the firm, seeking payments. By the end of October 2008, despite any formal announcement, press release, or news report, it was no longer possible to book flights with the airline, which had stopped flying.

Slok Air International
Once again, the airline was renamed to Slok Air International in early 2009. Flights re-commenced in February of the same year.

Destinations
Côte d'Ivoire
Abidjan (Port Bouet Airport)
The Gambia
Banjul (Banjul International Airport)
Ghana
Accra (Kotoka International Airport)
Guinea
Conakry (Conakry International Airport)
Liberia
Monrovia (Roberts International Airport)
Mali
Bamako (Senou International Airport)
Senegal
Dakar (Dakar-Yoff-Léopold Sédar Senghor International Airport)
Sierra Leone
Freetown (Lungi International Airport)

Fleet
The Slok Air International fleet consisted of the following aircraft:

6 Boeing 737-200 (only 1 used for scheduled services)

See also		
 List of defunct airlines of the Gambia
 Transport in the Gambia

References

Previous official website

External links

 via Wayback Machine

Airlines established in 1996
Airlines disestablished in 2004
Airlines established in 2004
Airlines disestablished in 2008
Defunct airlines of Nigeria
Defunct airlines of the Gambia
Defunct companies based in Lagos
2008 disestablishments in Nigeria
Nigerian companies established in 2004